Mihkel Lüdig ( in Vaskrääma – 7 May 1958 in Vändra) was an Estonian composer, organist and choir conductor. As a composer, he particularly worked on  a cappella choral songs. Lüdig is considered one of the major organisers of large-scale musical events in 20th century Estonia. He was a student of Nicolai Soloviev.

Events 
Lüdig initiated and led a number of events:
 the Singing Day of Pärnu in 1903;
 the opening of new building of Vanemuine in 1906;
 the Music Day of Tartu in 1909;
 the seventh Estonian Song Festival in 1910;
 the opening of Endla in 1911.

Business 

Career 
In 1918–1924, Lüdig worked as an organist of the Kaarli kirik.

In 1920–1922, Lüdig was an organ teacher in the Tallinn Higher School of Music, one of whose founders he had been in 1919.  Lüdig was also a director of the school in 1919–1923.

In 1925, Lüdig moved to Argentina, hoping to find better work.  However, the rumours of lack of organists in Buenos Aires turned out to be severely overblown, so his career there began at the post of an inn pianist; later he also conducted for a local German male choir.  In 1929, Lüdig moved back to Estonia.  Until 1932, he taught organ playing and played it himself in Tallinn; then, he moved to Pärnu and became a conductor of the Endla society.  In 1934–1958 — until his death — he lived and worked in Vändra.

Sources 
 Koolielu: Mihkel Lüdig

1880 births
1958 deaths
People from Pärnu
People from Kreis Pernau
Estonian Lutherans
Estonian organists
Male organists
Estonian choral conductors
20th-century organists
20th-century Estonian composers
20th-century Estonian musicians
20th-century conductors (music)
20th-century male musicians
Saint Petersburg Conservatory alumni
Moscow Conservatory alumni
Academic staff of the Estonian Academy of Music and Theatre
People's Artists of the Estonian Soviet Socialist Republic